Neko (ネコ or ねこ or 猫, cat) may refer to:

Characters
 Neko (K), an anime character from The K Project
 Neko Fukuta, a character in Hakobune Hakusho
 Neko, a non-player character in the Mana series of role-playing games
 Neko Kuroha, an anime character in Brynhildr in the Darkness
 Nekomusume or catgirl, a female character in Japanese anime and manga

People
 Neko Case (born 1970), American singer-songwriter
 Neko Hiroshi (born 1977), Japanese comedian
 Neko Oikawa, Japanese lyricist

Technology
 Neko (software), a cat screenmate application
 Neko Entertainment, a video-game developer and publisher
 NekoVM

Other uses
 Néko, a village in Ivory Coast
 Neko language, a Trans–New Guinea language
 Neko, a submissive role in a relationship between females in yuri or shōjo-ai media

See also
 
 
 Necco, a candy factory near Boston
 Necco Wafers, a traditional American confection made by Necco
 Necho (disambiguation)
 Nekomusume (disambiguation)